This page describes the qualifying rounds for the 2011-12 Turkish Airlines Euroleague.

The Qualifying Rounds consisted of two Final-Eight tournaments, held in Vilnius and Charleroi. The two winning teams advanced to the Euroleague Regular Season

Teams

Draw
The draw was made on Wednesday, July 6, 2011 at Barcelona, Spain. The draw determined the qualifying-round matchups and regular-season groups for the Euroleague, as well as the qualifying rounds for the Eurocup and the regular-season for the EuroChallenge.

Bracket
Bracket A
Games in Bracket A were played at the Siemens Arena in Vilnius, Lithuania.

Bracket B
Games in Bracket B were played at the Spiroudome in Charleroi, Belgium.

First qualifying round

Bracket A

Bracket B

Second qualifying round

Bracket A

Bracket B

Third qualifying round

Bracket A

Bracket B

References 

2011–12 Euroleague